World War One is a 2008 strategy video game published by Ascaron Entertainment for Microsoft Windows.

Reception
GamesRadar awarded World War One 7 out of 10, highlighting the vast game map of Europe, and the depth of diplomatic, economic and political options. The text-based tutorial was criticised, as was the slow AI and dull, uninformative combat results. IGN commented that "whatever joys might be found in the setting or the game design are still obscured by incomplete documentation, a clumsy interface and a number of bugs". IT Reviews said the game had a "user-unfriendly interface, an impenetrable tutorial and a constant desire to crash and burn".

References

World War I video games
2008 video games
Video games with historical settings
Computer wargames
Grand strategy video games
AGEod games
Video games developed in France
Windows games
Windows-only games